Egmont is a federal electoral district in Prince Edward Island, Canada, that has been represented in the House of Commons of Canada since 1968. Its population in 2001 was 35,208.

Demographics
Ethnic groups: 98.0% White, 1.4% Native Canadian 
Languages: 87.9% English, 10.9% French 
Religions: 54.1% Catholic, 38.4% Protestant, 1.8% Other Christian, 5.5% no affiliation 
Average income: $22,065

According to the Canada 2016 Census
 Languages: (2016) 89.6% English, 8.7% French, 0.4% Tagalog, 0.1% Arabic, 0.1% Spanish, 0.1% German, 0.1% Albanian, 0.1% Mandarin, 0.1% Vietnamese, 0.1% Cantonese, 0.1% Dutch

Geography
The district includes the part of Prince County located in Summerside and west of Summerside.  Communities include Summerside, Alberton, Tignish, O'Leary, Miscouche and Sherbrooke. The area is 1,527 km2.

History
The electoral district was created in 1966 from Prince riding. There has been no boundary changes as a result of the 2012 federal electoral redistribution.

Members of Parliament

This riding has elected the following Members of Parliament:

Election results

2021 general election

2019 general election

2015 general election

2011 general election

2008 general election

2006 general election

2004 general election

2000 general election

1997 general election

1993 general election

1988 general election

1984 general election

1980 general election

1979 general election

1974 general election

1972 general election

1968 general election

Student Vote results

2011 election
In 2011, a Student Vote was conducted at participating Canadian schools to parallel the 2011 Canadian federal election results. The vote was designed to educate students and simulate the electoral process for persons who have not yet reached the legal majority. Schools with a large student body that reside in another electoral district had the option to vote for candidates outside of the electoral district then where they were physically located.

See also
 List of Canadian federal electoral districts
 Past Canadian electoral districts

References

 
 Campaign expense data from Elections Canada

Notes

Prince Edward Island federal electoral districts
Politics of Summerside, Prince Edward Island